This is a list of wars involving the Arab Republic of Egypt and its predecessor states.

Ayyubid Sultanate (1174-1250)

Mamluk Sultanate (1250–1517)

Ottoman Eyalet of Egypt and Khedivate of Egypt (1803–1914)

Sultanate of Egypt (British Protectorate) (1914–1922)

Kingdom of Egypt (1922–1953)

Republic of Egypt (1953–1958)

United Arab Republic (1958–1971)

Arab Republic of Egypt (1971–present)

Notes

 
Egypt
Wars
Wars